Alis may refer to:

People 
 Alis (given name)
 Román Alís (1931–2006), Spanish composer
 Abdulla Aliş (1908–1944), Soviet writer

Places 
 Alis, Greece
 Alis District, Yauyos, Lima, Peru

Other uses 
 Alternate lighting of surfaces, a plasma display technology 
 Autonomic Logistics Information System, a special logistics automation program for the Lockheed Martin F-35 Lightning II

See also
 Ali (disambiguation)
 Allis (disambiguation)
 Alliss, a surname
 Alice (disambiguation)
 Elise (disambiguation)